The men's hammer throw event at the 2017 Summer Universiade was held on 23 and 24 August at the Taipei Municipal Stadium.

Medalists

Results

Qualification
Qualification: 60.00 m (Q) or at least 12 best (q) qualified for the final.

Final

References

Hammer throw
2017